Bert Morgan may refer to:

 Bert Morgan (photojournalist) (1904–1986), British-born American photojournalist
 Bert Morgan (cricketer) (1885–1959), English cricketer

See also
Albert Morgan (disambiguation)
Robert Morgan (disambiguation)